Kern Run is a tributary of Middle Creek in Snyder County, Pennsylvania, in the United States. The stream has two named tributaries: Luphers Run and Wetzel Run. Kern Run is dammed in one place to produce a  lake for drinking water and flood control. Some reaches of the stream are impaired. A number of bridges have also been constructed across it. The drainage basin of the stream is designated as a Coldwater Fishery and a Migratory Fishery. Wild trout naturally reproduce within it.

Course
Kern Run begins on a large ridge in Spring Township. It flows down the ridge in a northerly direction for several tenths of a mile before turning east-northeast for about a mile, flowing between the ridge and the much smaller Ore Ridge, and entering Beaver Township. Here, the stream turns north-northeast for a few tenths of a mile before entering an unnamed lake. The stream then turns north-northwest for a few tenths of a mile, leaving its valley. At this point, it turns north-northeast for more than a mile, passing through Beavertown and reentering Beaver Township. In Beavertown, the stream crosses US Route 522 and receives the tributary Luphers Run from the right. A short distance north of Beavertown, it receives the tributary Wetzel Run from the right and turns north-northwest for several tenths of a mile, passing between Freestone Ridge and Thomas Ridge and then reaching its confluence with Middle Creek.

Tributaries
Kern Run has two named tributaries: Luphers Run and Wetzel Run.

Geography and geology
The creek is a relatively small stream. Its headwaters are on a ridge sometimes known as Shade Mountain.

In its upper reaches, Kern Run is a mountain stream in a wild setting. In the late 1980s, one book described the stream as a "little mountain brook". However, it goes underground for a time near Beavertown.

Watershed and hydrology
The mouth of the stream is in the United States Geological Survey quadrangle of Beavertown. However its source is in the quadrangle of Beaver Springs. The stream's mouth is located near Beavertown.

Kern Run is dammed in one location; the site is known as PA-638.

Upstream of the lake on Kern Run, the watershed of the stream consists of 99 percent forested land, and 1 percent bodies of water, wetlands, and pastures.

Kern Run can be accessed via Township Road 588 from US Route 522.

One reach of Kern Run is designated as an impaired waterbody.

History
Kern Run was entered into the Geographic Names Information System on August 2, 1979. Its identifier in the Geographic Names Information System is 1178399.

A bridge carrying US Route 522 also crosses the stream in Beavertown and Beaver Township. It was slated for replacement for a cost of $500,476.

A lake was created on Kern Run in 1983. It is used for drinking water and flood control and is owned by the Spring Township Municipal Authority. The Spring Township Municipal Authority uses the lake as its primary water supply to serve approximately 1000 people.

Biology
The drainage basin of Kern Run is designated as a Coldwater Fishery and a Migratory Fishery. The stream is classified as Approved Trout Waters. In the 1980s, however,  of the stream was stocked with trout.

See also
Susquehecka Creek, next tributary of Middle Creek going downstream

List of rivers of Pennsylvania

References

Rivers of Snyder County, Pennsylvania
Tributaries of the Susquehanna River
Rivers of Pennsylvania